Euchromius superbellus is a species of moth in the family Crambidae described by Philipp Christoph Zeller in 1849. It is found in France, Spain, Italy, Croatia, Romania, Bulgaria, the Republic of Macedonia, Albania, Greece, Russia, Transcaucasia, Turkey and Armenia.

References

Moths described in 1849
Crambinae
Moths of Europe
Moths of Asia